The 2008 United States presidential election in New Jersey took place on November 4, 2008, and was part of the 2008 United States presidential election. Voters chose 15 representatives, or electors to the Electoral College, who voted for president and vice president.

New Jersey was won by Democratic nominee Barack Obama with a 15.53% margin of victory. Prior to the election, all 17 news organizations considered this a state Obama would win, or otherwise considered as a safe blue state. No fundraising money was spent by either campaign, as the state has trended towards the Democratic Party in recent years. A highly affluent and predominantly urban state with an ethnically diverse population, New Jersey has become a reliably blue state, and this was evident again when Democrat Barack Obama comfortably won the state's 15 electoral votes with 57.14% of the vote.

New Jersey weighed in for this election as 8.3% more Democratic than the national average.

Primaries

Democratic Primary

The Democratic primary took place February 5, 2008, also known as Super Tuesday. Hillary Clinton won this primary.

Republican primary

The Republican primary took place on February 5, 2008, with 52 national delegates who were allocated on a winner takes all basis.

* Candidate dropped out of the race before the primary

Campaign

Predictions 
There were 16 news organizations who made state-by-state predictions of the election. Here are their last predictions before election day:

Polling

Pre-election polling was tight early on. However, since October 12, Obama won each poll with a double-digit margin of victory and with at least 52%. McCain didn't reach over 42% in that stretch. The final 3 polls found Obama leading with 55% to 39%.

Fundraising
John McCain raised a total of $4,761,251 in the state. Barack Obama raised $13,624,081.

Advertising and visits
Neither candidate spent anything here. The Republican ticket visited the state twice. Obama visited the state once.

Analysis
New Jersey was once one of the most reliably Republican states in the Northeast. From 1948 to 1988, it voted Republican in all but two elections: John F. Kennedy in his narrow victory over Richard Nixon in 1960, and Lyndon Johnson's 44-state landslide of 1964. However, the brand of Republicanism practiced in New Jersey has historically been a moderate one. As the national party tilted more to the right, the state's voters became more friendly to Democrats. The state narrowly went for Bill Clinton in 1992 and has voted Democratic in every election since then. In all but one election since 1996, the Democrats have carried it by double digits. While Republicans remain competitive at the state and local level, at the presidential level New Jersey is now reckoned as part of the solid bloc of blue states in the Northeast.

Democrats have several structural advantages in New Jersey during presidential elections. The northeastern portion, including Newark, Jersey City, Elizabeth and Paterson, contains more than half the state's population and is heavily Democratic. The southwestern portion, including Camden, Cherry Hill, and Atlantic City is also heavily Democratic. These regions have a total of over 2,000,000 voters between them, making it extremely difficult for a Republican to carry the state. For instance, in 2004 George W. Bush held John Kerry to only a 7-point margin of victory, but was completely shut out in the northeast and southwest. Additionally, the state is split almost down the middle between the largest and fourth-largest markets in the country, New York City and Philadelphia. As a result, statewide races often feature some of the most expensive advertising budgets in the country.

Unlike in 2004, New Jersey was called for Obama almost as soon as the polls closed. Obama dominated the urban areas of the state, winning Essex County by over 50%, Hudson County by 47%, Camden and Mercer counties by 35%. Obama also won Somerset County, which had voted Republican in every election from 1968 to 2004. Most of the southern portion of the state voted Democratic. McCain won most of Northwestern New Jersey, winning in Republican strongholds like Morris County and Sussex County (which McCain won by 21%). McCain also won most of the Jersey Shore counties.

At the same time, incumbent Democratic U.S. Senator Frank Lautenberg was reelected over Republican Dick Zimmer by a 14.08% margin of victory. Lautenberg received 56.03% of the total vote while Zimmer took in 41.95%. Democrats also picked up a vacant U.S. House seat in New Jersey's 3rd congressional district that was previously held by a Republican; Democrat John Adler defeated Republican Chris Myers by a 3.30% margin of victory. Adler received 51.65% of the vote while Myers took in 48.35%.

Results

By county

Counties that flipped from Republican to Democratic
Salem (largest municipality: Pennsville Township)
Somerset (largest municipality: Franklin Township)

By congressional district
Barack Obama carried 10 of New Jersey's 13 congressional districts, including two that elected Republicans.

Electors

Technically the voters of NJ cast their ballots for electors: representatives to the Electoral College. NJ is allocated 15 electors because it has 13 congressional districts and 2 senators. All candidates who appear on the ballot or qualify to receive write-in votes must submit a list of 15 electors, who pledge to vote for their candidate and his or her running mate. Whoever wins the majority of votes in the state is awarded all 15 electoral votes. Their chosen electors then vote for president and vice president. Although electors are pledged to their candidate and running mate, they are not obligated to vote for them. An elector who votes for someone other than his or her candidate is known as a faithless elector.

The electors of each state and the District of Columbia met on December 15, 2008, to cast their votes for president and vice president. The Electoral College itself never meets as one body. Instead the electors from each state and the District of Columbia met in their respective capitols.

The following were the members of the Electoral College from the state. All 15 were pledged to Barack Obama and Joe Biden:
Jose Colon
William Fontanez
Gina Genovese
Wilma Grey
Kevin Halpern
Victor Herlinsky
Stacy Lubrecht
Salaheddin Mustafa
Peter Nichols
William W. Northgrave
Ken Saunders
Ginger Gold Schnitzer
Carl Styles
Shavonda Sumter
Stephen Weinstein

See also
 United States presidential elections in New Jersey
 Presidency of Barack Obama
 2008 Democratic Party presidential primaries
 2008 New Jersey Republican presidential primary

References

External links
 Official state totals (not yet fully updated)
Election 2008 CNN
Official Results (New Jersey Division of Elections)
Official Results by municipality

New Jersey
United States president
2008